Jonathan Lance King (born 22 April 1993) is a South African former footballer who played as a midfielder.

Club career
King, along with compatriot Reyaad Pieterse, was chosen along with six other young footballers for the Nike Academy's The Chance; a scouting project to find the best unsigned talent from around the world, with the hope of finding them a professional club to sign for. Prior to this experience, he had played for Sydenham Barnsley in Durban.

On his return to South Africa, King had a short spell with Blackburn Rovers (SA), before moving to Black Leopards in November 2014. After two seasons with the Leopards, in which he featured sparingly, he moved to fellow National First Division side Santos (SA).

Career statistics

Club

Notes

References

1993 births
Living people
Sportspeople from Durban
South African soccer players
Association football fullbacks
National First Division players
Nike Academy players
AmaZulu F.C. players
South African expatriate soccer players
South African expatriate sportspeople in England
Expatriate footballers in England